Rakovník District is a district in the Central Bohemian Region of the Czech Republic. Its capital is the town of Rakovník.

Administrative division
Rakovník District is formed by only one administrative district of municipality with extended competence: Rakovník.

List of municipalities
Towns are marked in bold and market towns in italics:

Bdín -
Branov -
Břežany -
Chrášťany -
Čistá -
Děkov -
Drahouš -
Hořesedly -
Hořovičky -
Hracholusky -
Hřebečníky -
Hředle -
Hvozd -
Janov -
Jesenice -
Kalivody -
Karlova Ves -
Kněževes -
Kolešov -
Kolešovice -
Kounov -
Kozojedy -
Krakov -
Krakovec -
Kroučová -
Krty -
Krupá -
Krušovice -
Křivoklát -
Lašovice -
Lišany -
Lubná -
Lužná -
Malinová -
Městečko -
Milostín -
Milý -
Mšec -
Mšecké Žehrovice -
Mutějovice -
Nesuchyně -
Nezabudice -
Nové Strašecí -
Nový Dům -
Olešná -
Oráčov -
Panoší Újezd -
Pavlíkov -
Petrovice -
Pochvalov -
Přerubenice -
Příčina -
Přílepy -
Pšovlky -
Pustověty -
Račice -
Rakovník -
Řeřichy -
Řevničov -
Roztoky -
Ruda -
Rynholec -
Šanov -
Senec -
Senomaty -
Šípy -
Skryje -
Slabce -
Smilovice -
Srbeč -
Švihov -
Svojetín -
Sýkořice -
Třeboc -
Třtice -
Václavy -
Velká Buková -
Velká Chmelištná -
Všesulov -
Všetaty -
Zavidov -
Zbečno -
Žďár

Geography

Slightly undulating plateaus and hilly landscape are typical for the district. The territory extends into four geomorphological mesoregions: Rakovník Uplands (west), Plasy Uplands (southwest), Křivoklát Highlands (southeast) and Džbán (north).

The most important river is the Berounka, which flows through a valley in the southern part of the district. The second notable river is the Loděnice, which springs here and supplies several ponds. The largest body of water is Klíčava Reservoir, even if it lies only partially in the district.

Křivoklátsko is the only protected landscape area. It covers a large part of the district in its southern and eastern parts.

Demographics

Most populated municipalities

Economy
The largest employers with its headquarters in Rakovník District and at least 500 employers are:

Transport
The D6 motorway from Prague to Karlovy Vary, including its unfinished section, passes through the district.

Sights

The most important monuments in the district, protected as national cultural monuments, are:
Křivoklát Castle
Sokol house in Rakovník

The best-preserved settlements, protected as monument zones, are:
Rakovník
Rousínov
Skryje

The most visited tourist destination is the Křivoklát Castle.

References

External links

Rakovník District profile on the Czech Statistical Office's website

 
Districts of the Czech Republic